Seguenzia hapala is a species of sea snail, a marine gastropod mollusk in the family Seguenziidae.

Description
The height of the shell attains 3 mm.

Distribution
This marine species occurs in the Gulf of Mexico, the Caribbean Sea, the Lesser Antilles; in the Atlantic Ocean off Florida and Northern Brazil at depths between 80 m and 150 m.

References

 Rosenberg, G., F. Moretzsohn, and E. F. García. 2009. Gastropoda (Mollusca) of the Gulf of Mexico, pp. 579–699 in Felder, D.L. and D.K. Camp (eds.), Gulf of Mexico–Origins, Waters, and Biota. Biodiversity. Texas A&M Press, College Station, Texas.

External links
 

hapala
Gastropods described in 1928